The Indian 1000-rupee banknote (1000) was a denomination of the Indian rupee. It was first introduced by the Reserve Bank of India in 1938 under British rule and subsequently demonetized in 1946. Post-independence, the denomination was re-introduced in 1954. In January 1978, all high-denomination banknotes of 1000, 5000, and 10000 were demonetized in order to curb unaccounted cash money.

In order to contain the volume of banknotes in circulation due to inflation, the 1000 banknote was again re-introduced in November 2000, under the government of Atal Bihari Vajpayee, as a part of the Mahatma Gandhi Series of banknotes; these were demonetized on 8 November 2016 by the Prime Minister of India Narendra Modi, with the claimed reasons of preventing the issue of counterfeit currency and to fight corruption and black money in India.

Mahatma Gandhi New Series
On 10 November 2016, the then Economic Affairs Secretary Shaktikanta Das announced a new 1000 banknote would be released in the Mahatma Gandhi New Series in the coming months. But on 22 February 2017, Das walked back on his earlier announcement to deny it, saying there was no plan to reintroduce the banknote.

Mahatma Gandhi Series

Design

The 1000 banknote of the Mahatma Gandhi Series was 177 × 73 mm Amber-red coloured, with the obverse side featuring a portrait of Mahatma Gandhi with a signature of the governor of Reserve Bank of India. It had a Braille feature to assist the visually challenged in identifying the currency. The reverse side featured the motif of an oil rig, a satellite and a steel foundry, all together featuring the Economy of India.

As of 2011, the new  sign had been incorporated into banknotes of 1000. In January 2014, RBI announced that it would be withdrawing from circulation all banknotes printed prior to 2005 by 31 March 2014. The deadline was later extended to 1 January 2015, and then again to 30 June 2016. Denomination of 1,000 notes cost was 3.54.

Security features

The security features of the 1000 banknote included:

A windowed security thread that read 'भारत' (Bharat in the Devanagari script) and 'RBI' alternately.
Latent image of the value of the banknote on the vertical band next to the right hand side of Mahatma Gandhi’s portrait.
Watermark of Mahatma Gandhi that is a mirror-image of the main portrait.
The number panel of the banknote was printed in embedded fluorescent fibres and optically variable ink.
Since 2005, additional security features (including machine-readable security thread, electrotype watermark, and year of print) appear on the bank note.

Discontinuation 

On 8 November 2016, Prime Minister Narendra Modi announced that "Starting from midnight 8th November 2016 all 1000 banknotes of the Mahatma Gandhi Series will not be accepted as a form of legal tender", although new 500 and 2000 banknotes of the new Mahatma Gandhi New Series were unveiled.

Languages

Like the other Indian rupee banknotes, the 1000 banknote had its value written in 17 languages. On the obverse, the denomination was written in English and Hindi. On the reverse is a language panel which displayed the denomination of the note in 15 of the 22 official languages of India, displayed in alphabetical order. Languages included on the panel were Assamese, Bengali, Gujarati, Kannada, Kashmiri, Konkani, Malayalam, Marathi, Nepali, Odia, Punjabi, Sanskrit, Tamil, Telugu and Urdu.

References

Banknotes of India
Rupee
One-thousand-base-unit banknotes
Currencies introduced in 2000